Zdeněk Stromšík (born 25 November 1994) is a Czech sprinter. He represented his country in the 60 metres at the 2018 World Indoor Championships where he got injured and finished last in his heat.

International competitions

1Did not start in the final

Personal bests
Outdoor
100 metres – 10.16 (+1.7 m/s, Tábor 2018)
100 metres - 10.11 (+ 3.0 m/s, Brno 2018)
200 metres – 21.46 (+0.2 m/s, Hodonín 2013)
Indoor
60 metres – 6.60 (Linz 2018)

References

1994 births
Living people
Czech male sprinters
Athletes (track and field) at the 2010 Summer Youth Olympics
People from Valašské Meziříčí
European Games competitors for the Czech Republic
Athletes (track and field) at the 2019 European Games
Competitors at the 2017 Summer Universiade
Competitors at the 2019 Summer Universiade
Sportspeople from the Zlín Region